The Royal and Venerable Confraternity of the Most Blessed Sacrament of Mafra, alternatively, the Royal and Venerable Brotherhood of the Most Blessed Sacrament of Mafra, is a public association of faithful of the Catholic Church, canonically established in the Basilica of Our Lady and Saint Anthony of Mafra, Portugal.

The confraternity is one of the oldest institutions in the municipality of Mafra. It organizes the Corpus Christi solemnity and organizes the four traditional processions of the season of Lent in Mafra:

The procession of the Passion of the Lord (Portuguese: Procissão do Senhor Jesus dos Passos);
The procession of Penance of the Third Order of Saint Francis (Portuguese: Procissão de Penitência da Ordem Terceira de São Francisco);
The procession of Seven Sorrows of Our Lady (Portuguese: Procissão das Sete Dores de Nossa Senhora); and
The procession of the Burial of the Lord (Portuguese: Procissão do Enterro do Senhor).

Over time, the confraternity has been the custodian of several relics. Those include Louis XV of France's coronation shirt, which he wore for the ceremony in Reims Cathedral.

The confraternity also holds the largest collection of processional mannequin-style images (Portuguese: imagens de vestir or imagens de roca) in the country. Some of these are still used for religious processions.

Part of the confraternity ceremonies and religious functions take place with the sound of the basilica's six historical pipe organs and two Mafra carillons.

History 

The confraternity was created in the 16th century, at the St. Andrew's Church. The first record of the confraternity appears in a will dated 14 March 1597, and the oldest document of the confraternity is the Statutes agreement of 5 June 1725.

Dom Tomás Xavier de Lima, 13th Viscount of Vila Nova de Cerveira and 1st Marquis of Ponte de Lima, Secretary of State of the Kingdom of Portugal from 1 April 1786 to 15 December 1788, was a member of the confraternity. Another member was the Capitão-Mor (High-Captain) of Mafra, José Máximo de Carvalho, mentioned by William Beckford in his diary.

In 1835, after the extinction of religious orders in Portugal, the confraternity moved to the Basilica of Our Lady and St. Anthony in Mafra, at the invitation of Queen Maria II of Portugal.

In 1866 the Civil Government bequeathed the assets of the extinct Third Order of St. Francis to this institution, and later also received the assets of the extinct Confraternity of the Lord Jesus of the Stations of Mafra (Portuguese: Irmandade do Senhor Jesus dos Passos de Mafra), while assigning to the confraternity the responsibility of organising all processions according to the local religious calendar.

The confraternity remained under the patronage of the Portuguese monarchy until the proclamation of the Republic in 1910. Manuel II, the last King of Portugal was a lifetime honorary member of the confraternity. In 1953, after the return of the Procession of the Seven Sorrows of Our Lady, the confraternity received the assets of the extinct Confraternity of Our Lady of Sorrows of Mafra (Irmandade de Nossa Senhora das Dores de Mafra, in Portuguese), again with the responsibility of organising this procession annually.

On 10 November 2020, Pope Francis granted a canonical coronation to the image of Our Lady of Solitude guarded by the confraternity. This announcement was made public on 13 December 2020 with the Mafra carillons playing the Inno e Marcia Pontificale. The coronation is set to take place on 17 September 2023, simultaneously with the Fourth Pan-European Forum of Brotherhoods and Confraternities.

Traditional Lent season processions in Mafra 

The processions of Lent in Mafra started in the 18th century. Thanks to conservation and restoration efforts, these ceremonies maintain the grand Baroque flair.

These processions were officially declared by the Municipality as Intangible Cultural Heritage of Municipal Interest.

Procession of the Passion of the Lord (Via Crucis) 
This is one of the oldest expressions of piety in Mafra, and originated from the old collegiate church of St. Andrew's in the 17th century.

It takes place on the second Sunday of Lent, which is also known as the Procession of Encounter, and is composed of two processions that join at a determined moment of the route.

The Procession of the Passion of the Lord exits from the basilica of the Royal Building of Mafra and of Our Lady which exits from Campo Santo  Chapel, also located in the Royal Building of Mafra.

Procession of Penance of the Third Order of Saint Francis 
The first procession occurred on 27 March 1740, as a religious festivity directly related to the work of the Third Order of Saint Francis of Mafra patron, King John V.

This procession occurs on the fourth Sunday of Lent. Its processional protocol has remained unchanged since inception by Brother Matias da Conceição, Librarian of the Convent of Mafra. It is therefore a unique cultural manifestation of the solemn and elaborate Baroque period.

The images of the 10 religious litters, alluding to the history of the Franciscans, were created by sculptor Manuel Dias. Most of these pieces still have the original vestments acquired by João Pedro Ludovice, son of Johann Friedrich Ludwig, the architect in charge of the Royal Building of Mafra.

The crucifix used in the litter of the stigmatisation of St. Francis in Mount La Verna is attributed to Anton Maria Maragliano, a genoese sculptor of the Baroque period. Was offered to the Third Order of Mafra by Domenico Massa, the carpenter tasked with the installation of the carillons in the towers of the Basilica.

Procession of the Seven Sorrows of Our Lady 
The Confraternity of Our Lady of Sorrows, created in 1779, in the old collegiate church of St. Andrew's in Mafra, organized the first procession in 1793.

It takes place on Palm Sunday, the Sunday before Friday of Sorrows celebrating the Feast of the Seven Sorrows of Our Lady.

The procession is composed of seven religious litters corresponding to the seven sorrows of the Mother of Jesus, and an eighth, with the image of Our Lady of Sorrows.

It comprises more than fifty images attributed to the sculptor Joaquim José de Barros Laborão, one of the last masters from the School of Sculpture of Mafra, according to Armindo Ayres de Carvalho.

This procession is popularly known as "Procession of the Little Donkey" (Portuguese: Procissão da Burrinha), originally depicted in the religious litter of the flight into Egypt, in which the Virgin is depicted as seated on a donkey.

Procession of the Burial of the Lord 
The exact origin of this procession is uncertain. It takes place on the night of Good Friday.

In 1773, the Third Order of St. Francis commissioned a new image of Our Lady of Solitude, this same image still used on the procession.

This solemn procession, represents the death of Our Lord Jesus Christ. The silent funeral procession, is accompanied by Veronica’s and The Three Marys lamentations.

This ancient Catholic tradition, and unique to Mafra, is accompanied by the Centurion, a typical figure in the town's folk art, dressed in original garments dating back to the 18th century.

References

Bibliography 

  .
  .
 
  .
 
  .
 
  .
 
  .
  .

External links

 
 
 
 
 
 
 
 
 
 
 
 
 
 

Confraternities
Mafra
Catholic organizations established in the 16th century
Palace of Mafra
Louis XV